Emelie Rosenqvist (born 27 November 1980) is a Swedish actress.

Selected filmography
1993 - Allis med is (TV)
1996 - Skuggornas hus (TV)
1998 - Pip-Larssons (TV)
2005 - Lasermannen (TV series)
2005 - Kommissionen (TV)
2006 - LasseMajas detektivbyrå (TV series)
2006 - Min frus förste älskare
2007 - Upp till kamp (TV)

References

External links

Swedish actresses
1980 births
Living people